Nicolaas Lambrechts (born 24 October 1961) is a South African former cricketer. He played in 33 first-class and 11 List A matches for Boland from 1982/83 to 1990/91.

See also
 List of Boland representative cricketers

References

External links
 

1961 births
Living people
South African cricketers
Boland cricketers
People from Worcester, South Africa
Cricketers from the Western Cape